In the Spotlight is the fifteenth studio album by the American singer-songwriter and bass guitar player Suzi Quatro.

The seeds for the album were sown when Mike Chapman, Quatro's original producer and composer of most of her hits, approached her with plans to take her back to her roots. Their reunion resulted in this modern take on Quatro's original attitude, which shows the influence she has had on modern female artists. "Strict Machine", a song originally performed by Goldfrapp, even contains a two line teaser from Quatro's number one hit "Can the Can", to show the similarities of the two tracks.

When the album was released, it received many positive reviews—Mojo rated the album . 
Allmusic rated it , commenting that (except for one track): "...In the Spotlight is an impressive comeback, which admirably doesn't rely solely on nostalgia to make itself heard." In September and October 2011, soon after the album was released, Quatro made a 21 performance sold-out Rocks the Spotlight Tour of Australia, also with great reviews.

Release, promotion, marketing 
In the Spotlight was first released in Australia on 5 August 2011.
Then the album was released in Germany on 19 August 2011.
Finally, it was released in the rest of the world (including the USA) on 29 August 2011.

Victory Tischler-Blue produced the official music video for Suzi Quatro's "Strict Machine", a track from the album. This track is a cover of Goldfrapp's "Strict Machine", but Quatro's version of the song contains two extra lines from her own number one hit "Can the Can" (to show the similarity of the two songs' tunes).

On 16 November 2011 the official music video was released via the SUZI QUATRO OFFICIAL YouTube channel. It includes live footage from Quatro's September/October 2011 Rocks the Spotlight Tour of Australia and the extra two lines from "Can the Can".

Critical reception

Germany
Ulf Kubanke reviewed the album for laut.de. He rated the album .

Constantin Aravanlis reviewed the album favourably for Monsters and Critics.de.

Austria
Gerald C. Stocker reviewed the album for The Gap. He rated the album .

United Kingdom
Mojo magazine rated the album .

There were two reviews by Wears the Trousers Magazine. Alan Pedder reviewed the album's single "Whatever Love Is" and went on to comment about some other album tracks. Rhian Jones reviewed the album itself. Pedder commented favourably on two tracks, unfavourably on two tracks, and did not comment on seven tracks. Jones commented favourably (directly or indirectly) on eight tracks, unfavourably on one track, and did not comment on two tracks.

Reviewing the single, Pedder wrote that Quatro's "Whatever Love Is"... 
"is squarely aimed at her existing fans. ...".
He described "Strict Machine" and "Breaking Dishes" as "ropey covers" but concluded that "Hard Headed Woman"...
"is a much better fit for Quatro’s seasoned, raspy vocals".

By contrast (reviewing the album) Jones wrote about "Breaking Dishes"...
"yielding surprisingly well to a fundamentalist glam treatment and the gutsiness of Quatro’s vocal approach. ...".
She also wrote that Quatro...
"has a decent stab at the wistful rock splendour of Yeah Yeah Yeahs’ ‘Turn Into’. ...".
Jones concludes that:
"...Despite one or two shaky moments then, In The Spotlight is a warm and triumphant slice of retro-rock".

United States
Jon O'Brien of Allmusic commented favourably on nine tracks, unfavourably on one track, and did not comment on one track. He wrote that Quatro's "Strict Machine" is...
"a guitar-chugging mash-up of Goldfrapp's electro-pop reinvention in "Strict Machine"; [with] her own 1973 U.K. chart-topper "Can the Can," cleverly referencing the subtle similarities between the two; ...".

O'Brien concluded that:
"...A misguided attempt at cod-reggae aside ("Hurt with You"), In the Spotlight is an impressive comeback, which admirably doesn't rely solely on nostalgia to make itself heard".
He rated the album .

Track listing

In the Spotlight
The musicians Nat Allison, Jez Davies, Owen Martin, and Mike Chapman contributed to all of the tracks except "Singing with Angels".

Note 1 — according to the In the Spotlight CD booklet, "Morse/Lewis/Walters/Womack" wrote "Hot Kiss".
According to AllMusic, the only composers were "Lewis, Morse".
Note 2 — it is generally accepted that Elvis Presley is the original artist for "Hard Headed Woman". Wears the Trousers Magazine (in its reviews of the album and of the associated single "Whatever Love Is") refers to "Wanda Jackson’s ‘Hard Headed Woman’".

In the Dark
 
Victory Tischler-Blue produced both of the bonus enhanced video tracks.

Personnel

 Nat Allison guitars, backing vocals
 Ray Beavis saxophone (on "Hurt with You")
 David Bianco recording (of "Strict Machine", "Breaking Dishes", "Hot Kiss", "Turn Into")
 Mike Chapman production, backing vocals
 Jez Davies keyboards
 Pat Doonan official website
 Joey Galvan The neighborhood Bullys (on "Strict Machine", "Breaking Dishes", "Hot Kiss", "Turn Into")
 Toby Gucklhorn trombone (on "Hurt with You")
 Rainer Haas worldwide booking
 Dick Hanson trumpet (on "Hurt with You")
 Michael Hays The neighborhood Bullys (on "Strict Machine", "Breaking Dishes", "Hot Kiss", "Turn Into")
 Steve Kitchen artwork
 Owen Martin drums
 Davey Meshell production, The neighborhood Bullys (on "Strict Machine", "Breaking Dishes", "Hot Kiss", "Turn Into")
 Tex Mosley The neighborhood Bullys (on "Strict Machine", "Breaking Dishes", "Hot Kiss", "Turn Into")
 Simon Pilton "support and inspiration"
 Suzi Quatro vocals, bass
 Daryl Smith artwork
 Nick Trepka engineering

"Singing with Angels"

 James Burton guitar
 Steve Grant production
 The Jordanaires backing vocals
 Suzi Quatro vocals, bass
 Andy Scott production

Release history

References

External links
Musicians
 "Rock ‘n’ Roll is not just about the clothes you wear..." according to Nat Allison's official web site
 Jez Davies and Owen Martin are members of The Nat Martin Band. The official web site of The Nat Martin Band says that "collectively the musicians in the band offer a number of different musical influences including Blues, Jazz, Fusion, Funk, Soul and Classical"

Guest musicians
 Ray Beavis' official website describes him as a "saxophonist & teacher based in Exeter, UK"
 The official website of The Neighborhood Bullys calls them "the best f%$King [sic] rock & roll band in Los Angeles"

Suzi Quatro albums
2011 albums
2012 albums
Albums produced by Mike Chapman
Cherry Red Records albums